A lake island is any landmass within a lake. Lake islands may form a lake archipelago.

Formation 
Lake islands may form in numerous ways. They may occur through a build-up of sedimentation as shoals, and become true islands through changes in the level of the lake. They may have been originally part of the lake's shore, and been separated from it by erosion, or they may have been left as pinnacles when the lake formed through a raising in the level of a river or other waterway (either naturally, or artificially through the damming of a river or lake). On creation of a glacial lake a moraine can form an island. They may also have formed through earthquake, meteor, or volcanic activity. In the latter case, crater or caldera islands exist, with new volcanic prominences in lakes formed in the craters of larger volcanoes. Other lake islands include ephemeral beds of floating vegetation, and islands artificially formed by human activity.

Volcanic crater and caldera lake islands

Lakes may sometimes form in the circular depressions of volcanic craters. These craters are typically circular or oval basins around the vent or vents from which magma erupts. 
A large volcanic eruption sometimes results in the formation of a caldera, caused by the collapse of the magma chamber under the volcano. If enough magma is ejected, the emptied chamber is unable to support the weight of the volcano, and a roughly circular fracture, the ring fault, develops around the edge of the chamber. The centre of the volcano within the ring fracture collapses, creating a ring-shaped depression. Long after the eruption, this caldera may fill with water to become a lake. If volcanic activity continues or restarts, the centre of the caldera may be uplifted in the form of a resurgent dome, to become a crater lake island. Though typically calderas are larger and deeper than craters and form in different ways, a distinction between the two is often ignored in non-technical circumstances and the term crater lake is widely used for the lakes formed in both craters and calderas. The following is a list of large or notable crater lake islands:

 La Corota Island Flora Sanctuary in the Laguna de la Cocha, Colombia
 Teodoro Wolf and Yerovi Islands in Cuicocha Lake, Ecuador
 Teopan Island in Lake Coatepeque, El Salvador
 Islas Quemadas in Lake Ilopango, El Salvador
 Samosir Island in Lake Toba, Sumatra, Indonesia
 Bisentina and Martana Islands in Lake Bolsena, Italy
 Kamuishu Island in Lake Mashū, Hokkaidō, Japan
 Nakano Island in Lake Tōya, Hokkaidō, Japan
 Mokoia Island in Lake Rotorua, North Island, New Zealand
 Motutaiko Island in Lake Taupo, North Island, New Zealand
 Two islands in Lake Dakataua, in the caldera of Dakataua, West New Britain Province, Papua New Guinea
 Volcano Island in Taal Lake, Luzon, Philippines (and Vulcan Point in Crater Lake on Volcano Island)
 Samang, Chayachy, Serdtse (Heart), Nizkii (Low), and Glinyanii (Clay) Islands in Kurile Lake, Kamchatka, Russia
 Lahi, Molemole, Si'i, and A'ali Islands in Lake Vai Lahi, Niuafo'ou, Tonga
 Meke Dağı Island in Meke Golu crater lake, Turkey
 Horseshoe Island (now submerged) in Mount Katmai's crater lake, Alaska, United States
 Wizard Island and Phantom Ship in Crater Lake, Oregon, United States

Impact crater islands

Impact craters, formed by the collision of large meteorites or comets with the Earth, are relatively uncommon, and those which do exist are frequently heavily eroded or deeply buried. Several, however, do contain lakes. Where the impact crater is complex, a central peak emerges from the floor of the crater. If a lake is present, this central peak may break the water's surface as an island. In other cases, other geological processes may have caused only a ring-shaped annular lake to remain from an impact, with a large central island taking up the remaining area of the crater. The world's largest impact crater island (and the world's second-largest lake island of any kind) is René-Levasseur Island, in Lake Manicouagan, Canada. The Sanshan Islands of Lake Tai, China, are also examples of impact crater islands, as are the islands in Canada's Clearwater Lakes, and the Slate Islands of Lake Superior, also in Canada. Sollerön Island in Siljan Lake, Sweden, and an unnamed island in Lake Karakul, Tajikistan, was also formed by meteor impact.

Floating islands

The term floating island is sometimes used for accumulations of vegetation free-floating within a body of water. Due to the lack of currents and tides, these are more frequently found in lakes than in rivers or the open sea. Peaty masses of vegetable matter from shallow lake floors may rise due to the accumulation of gases during decomposition, and will often float for a considerable time, becoming ephemeral islands until the gas has dissipated enough for the vegetation to return to the lake floor.

Artificial islands

Artificial or man-made islands are islands constructed by human activity rather than formed by natural means. They may be totally created by humans, enlarged from existing islands or reefs, formed by joining small existing islands, or cut from a mainland (for example, by cutting through the isthmus of a peninsula). Artificial islands have a long history, dating back to the crannogs of prehistoric Britain and Ireland, and the traditional floating Uru islands of Lake Titicaca in South America. Notable early artificial islands include the Aztec city of Tenochtitlan, at the site of modern Mexico City. Though technically caused by human activity, islands formed from hilltops by the deliberate flooding of valleys (such as in the creation of hydroelectricity projects and reservoirs) are not normally regarded as artificial islands.

Artificial islands are built for numerous uses, ranging from flood protection to immigration or quarantine stations. Other uses for reclaimed artificial islands include expansion of living space or transportation centres in densely populated regions. Agricultural land has also been developed through reclamation of polders in the Netherlands and other low lying countries.

Notable modern examples of artificial lake islands include the Dutch polder of Flevopolder in Flevoland, the island of IJburg in Amsterdam, and Flamingo Island in Kamfers Dam, South Africa. At , Flevopolder, in the now-freshwater lake IJsselmeer, is the largest man-made island in the world.

Lists of lake islands

Naturally occurring lake islands by area 
Of these, five are located in the large Great Lakes of North America, three are located in the large African Great Lakes, one is located in the largest lake in Central America, one was formed by the world's fourth largest meteorite impact, and one is located in the largest (by volume) lake in the world.
 Manitoulin Island in Lake Huron, Canada – 
 René-Levasseur Island in the Manicouagan Reservoir, Quebec, Canada – . It became an artificial island when the Manicouagan Reservoir was flooded in 1970, merging Mouchalagane Lake on the western side and Manicouagan Lake on the eastern side.
 Olkhon in Lake Baikal, Russia – 
 Isle Royale in Lake Superior, United States – 
 Ukerewe Island in Lake Victoria, Tanzania – 
 St. Joseph Island in Lake Huron, Canada – 
 Drummond Island in Lake Huron, United States – 
 Idjwi in Lake Kivu, Democratic Republic of the Congo – 
 Ometepe Island in Lake Nicaragua, Nicaragua – 
 Bugala Island in Lake Victoria, Uganda –  
 St. Ignace Island in Lake Superior, Canada –  
Note:
 Soisalo, a  body of land in Finland that is surrounded by individual lakes (Kallavesi, Suvasvesi, Kermajärvi, Ruokovesi, Haukivesi and Unnukka) connected by creeks and rivers – rather than sitting within an individual lake – was suggested in a 1987 study as an island, due to being effectively "surrounded by water".
 Samosir, a  body of land in Lake Toba, Indonesia, is a peninsula that is technically surrounded by water only because a canal was built across it, effectively separating it from the mainland. For this reason, it is not a naturally occurring lake island.

Other lake islands larger than 

 Ometepe Island in Lake Nicaragua, Nicaragua - 276 km2 (107 sq mi)
 Big Simpson Island in Great Slave Lake, Canada – 
 Blanchet Island in Great Slave Lake, Canada –  
 Rubondo Island in  Lake Victoria, Tanzania – 
 Buvuma Island in Lake Victoria, Uganda – 
 The largest island in Sobradinho Reservoir, Brazil – 
 Glover Island in Grand Lake, Canada – 
 Michipicoten Island in Lake Superior, Canada – 
 Preble Island in Great Slave Lake, Canada – 
 Cockburn Island in Lake Huron, Canada – 
 Hurissalo in Lietvesi, Finland – 
 Partalansaari in Haapaselkä, Finland – 
 Teresa Island in Atlin Lake, Canada - 
 Hecla Island in Lake Winnipeg, Canada – 
 Beaver Island in Lake Michigan, United States – 
 Sugar Island in Lake Nicolet – Lake George, United States – 
 Wolfe Island in Lake Ontario, Canada – 
 Viljakansaari in Haapaselkä, Finland – 
 Antelope Island in the Great Salt Lake, United States – 
 Black Island in Lake Winnipeg, Canada – 
 Selaön in Mälaren, Sweden – 
 Bois Blanc Island in Lake Huron, United States – 
 Grand Isle in Lake Champlain, United States – 
 Ukara Island in Lake Victoria, Tanzania –

Tallest lake islands

Islands within lakes recursively

 The largest lake on an island is Nettilling Lake on Baffin Island, Canada – .
 The largest island in a lake is Manitoulin Island in Lake Huron, Canada – .
 The largest island in a lake on an island is Samosir (a peninsula that is technically "surrounded by water" only because a narrow canal was built across it) in Danau Toba on Sumatra – .
 The largest lake on an island in a lake is Lake Manitou on Manitoulin Island in Lake Huron – .
 The largest island in a lake on an island in a lake is Treasure Island in Mindemoya Lake on Manitoulin Island in Lake Huron.

Notable island systems and former lake islands

 Vozrozhdeniya Island in the Aral Sea, Kazakhstan and Uzbekistan – .  Originally only , the island grew rapidly from the 1960s until mid-2001, as the shrinking of the Aral Sea caused the water to recede from the land around the original island, until the moment when that same process caused the expanded island to connect to the mainland. By 2014, what used to be an island had become merely a part of the extensive Aralkum Desert.
 Sääminginsalo in Saimaa, Finland – . Saimaa is sometimes referred to as a "lake system", and Sääminginsalo is surrounded by three separately named lakes (Haukivesi, Puruvesi and Pihlajavesi) that are at the same level, and by an artificial canal, Raikuun kanava, built in the 1750s. Since it is only separated from other land by a canal, it is debatable whether Sääminginsalo can be considered an island.
 The Pamvotida lake, next to the city of Ioannina, Greece - , has an island with a village. The name of the village is "Nisos", which is the Greek word for island. The village has 219 permanent residents according to the 2011 census.

Islands in artificial lakes
 Islands of Lake Argyle, some seventy named islands in Lake Argyle, Australia

See also

Lists of islands (by ocean, sea, lake or river)
Recursive islands and lakes
River island

References 

 
 Lakes
Islands
Islands by type